Orsocoma is a genus of moths of the family Yponomeutidae.

Species
Orsocoma macrogona - Meyrick, 1921 

Yponomeutidae